Carin Jämtin (born 3 August 1964 in Stockholm) is a Swedish civil servant and former politician who has been serving as the Director General of the Swedish International Development Agency since 2017. She served as party secretary of the Social Democrats from March 2011 until her resignation in August 2016 and previously served as Minister for International Development Cooperation in the Swedish Government between 2003 and 2006. She was a Member of the Riksdag from 2014 to 2017, representing Stockholm Municipality.

Early life and education
Jämtin briefly studied at Stockholm University, without obtaining any degree.

Political career
Jämtin began her political career in the Swedish Social Democratic Youth League, and was a board member of the organization from 1990 to 1992, thereafter serving as treasurer and acting secretary. Prior to her appointment in 2003, she worked as the Deputy Secretary General of the Olof Palme International Center.

Member of the Swedish Parliament
At the general election in September 2006, Jämtin was elected to the Riksdag, i.e. member of parliament. Only a month later, in October 2006, she was elected Leader of the Opposition in the City Council of Stockholm. She decided to keep her seat in parliament for at least two months, citing her desire to fight for proposals made by Social-Democrats from Stockholm. While Jämtin was one of the favourites to succeed Göran Persson as leader of the Social Democrats at the party's congress in March 2007, her retention of the seat in parliament fuelled speculation that she might run for party leadership. It was generally considered that the next Social Democratic leader should be a member of parliament.

On 23 November 2006, Sweden's biggest newspaper Aftonbladet (independently social-democratic), endorsed Jämtin as party leader, but she declined running.

On 16 August 2016, Jämtin announced her intention to resign as party secretary in order to fulfill her position as Member of the Riksdag.

Other activities
 European Council on Foreign Relations (ECFR), Member

Views on Israel-Palestine conflict
During a visit to Israel and the West Bank in 2005 Jämtin called the wall between the two "Crazy and sick" and that she felt that a two state solution is impossible because of Israels actions, and that if Israel wants to build a wall it should do so in its own territory. The comments received a lot of commentary from media in Sweden. In September 2011, Jämtin along with Urban Ahlin voiced their support for a Swedish recognition of a Palestinian state.

References

External links

21st-century Swedish women politicians
1964 births
Living people
Swedish Ministers for International Development Cooperation
Women government ministers of Sweden
Female foreign ministers
Members of the Riksdag from the Social Democrats
Women members of the Riksdag
Politicians from Stockholm
Stockholm University alumni
Swedish women diplomats